The Latvian Basketball League (LBL) also known as the Pafbet LBL for sponsorship reasons, is the national basketball championship in Latvia; composed of 6 teams. It is considered the biggest basketball league in Latvia. The LBL is a part of Latvian Basketball Association, which is the national governing body of basketball in Latvia.

Its 6 teams are located in 5 cities; two in Riga, and one in Ventspils, Liepāja, Valmiera, and Ogre. The LBL season usually runs from September to April. The league was founded in 1992, and its first season was played in the same year.

History

Early years 

The first LBL season was played in 1992. From 1992 to 1999 all championships were won by BK Brocēni, however, from 2000 to 2006 BK Ventspils were the champions. In 2007, ASK Rīga stopped BK Ventspils winning streak. BK Ventspils won again in 2009, beating Barons/LMT in a thriller 4–3. Barons would return to the final the following year, this time against VEF Rīga, and win by the same 4–3 margin. The 2011 final again went to 7 games, with VEF Rīga defeating Ventspils.

Teams

Title holders

 1992 Brocēni Parair
 1992–93 Brocēni
 1993–94 SWH Brocēni
 1994–95 SWH Brocēni
 1995–96 ASK Brocēni
 1996–97 ASK Brocēni LMT
 1997–98 ASK Brocēni LMT
 1998–99 Brocēni LMT
 1999–00 Ventspils
 2000–01 Ventspils
 2001–02 Ventspils
 2002–03 Ventspils
 2003–04 Ventspils
 2004–05 Ventspils
 2005–06 Ventspils
 2006–07 ASK Riga
 2007–08 Barons LMT
 2008–09 Ventspils
 2009–10 Barons LMT
 2010–11 VEF Rīga
 2011–12 VEF Rīga
 2012–13 VEF Rīga
 2013–14 Ventspils
 2014–15 VEF Rīga
 2015–16 Valmiera Ordo
 2016–17 VEF Rīga
 2017–18 Ventspils
 2018–19 VEF Rīga
 2019–20 VEF Rīga
 2020–21 VEF Rīga
 2021–22 VEF Rīga

Performance by club

The finals

References

External links
Official Website 
Eurobasket.com League Page

 
Basketball leagues in Latvia
Sports leagues established in 1992
1992 establishments in Latvia